Cyamops halteratus is a species of fly in the family Periscelididae.

References

halteratus
Articles created by Qbugbot
Insects described in 1958